Khivabad (also Old Khivabad or New Khivabad) is a village in the Ahal Province of Turkmenistan. It is famed for the fortress of Nadir Shah.

History 
Nader Shah had constructed a fortress in the area; local tradition argues Shah to have employed thousands of prisoners of war in bringing soil from Khiva for construction. Much of the fort and its components survive — the complex is now designated as Old-Khivabad. Entrances through the north and east walls lead into the main building, at the center.

Notes

References 

Ahal Region